Badea Stelian (born 29 July 1958), widely known as Stelică Badea, is a retired Romanian football midfielder.

Biography
He was born in Bucşani and his first steps in football were under the guidance of coach Stere Popescu. He debuted at I.O.R. Bucharest, and at twenty years of age he had reached FC Olt Scorniceşti. In 1980, he arrived in Piteşti, where he soon took the left midfield position. He played ten seasons at FC Argeş Piteşti, playing 244 matches and scoring twenty goals.

Coach's activity
 1990–1992 Dacia Piteşti, 3rd League
 1992–1993 FC Argeş Piteşti, 2nd League and 1st League
 1993–2000 Dacia Piteşti, 3rd League and 2nd League with 2 promovations in 2nd League and 1st League
 2000–2001 Cimentul Fieni, 2nd League
 2001–2004 Internaţional Piteşti, 2nd League
 2004–2005 Astra Ploieşti, 2nd League
 2005–2006 FC Naţional II, 2nd League
 2006–2007 AL Hilal Riyadh, Saudi Arabia
 2010–2011 AL Riyadh, Saudi Arabia

External links
Badea Stelian on FC Argeş Piteşti history website
Romanian Professional Football

References

1958 births
Living people
Romanian footballers
CS Mioveni managers
FC Argeș Pitești players
FC Olt Scornicești players
Romanian football managers
FC Astra Giurgiu managers
Expatriate football managers in Saudi Arabia
Romanian expatriate sportspeople in Saudi Arabia
Association football midfielders
Al-Riyadh SC managers
People from Giurgiu County